Jordi Núñez Carretero (born 19 September 1968 in Granollers, Barcelona) is a Spanish handball player who competed in the 1996 Summer Olympics and in the 2000 Summer Olympics.

In 1996 he won the bronze medal with the Spanish team. He played five matches as goalkeeper.

Four years later he won his second bronze medal with the Spanish handball team in the 2000 Olympic tournament. He played four matches as goalkeeper.

External links
profile

1968 births
Living people
Spanish male handball players
Handball players from Catalonia
Olympic handball players of Spain
Handball players at the 1996 Summer Olympics
Handball players at the 2000 Summer Olympics
Olympic bronze medalists for Spain
BM Ciudad Real players
Olympic medalists in handball
Medalists at the 2000 Summer Olympics
Medalists at the 1996 Summer Olympics
Sportspeople from Granollers
BM Granollers players
20th-century Spanish people